Portraits of Duke Ellington is an album by jazz guitarist Joe Pass that was released in 1975. It peaked at number 37 on the Jazz Albums chart. It is a tribute to jazz musician Duke Ellington and was recorded shortly after his death.

Reception

Writing for Allmusic, music critic Scott Yanow wrote of the album "The interplay between the three musicians is quite impressive, and Pass' mastery of the guitar is obvious (he didn't really need the other sidemen). Recommended."

Track listing
All songs composed by Duke Ellington, lyricists indicated.
 "Satin Doll" (Johnny Mercer, Billy Strayhorn) – 5:46
 "I Let a Song Go Out of My Heart" (Irving Mills, Henry Nemo, John Redmond) – 5:32
 "Sophisticated Lady" (Mills, Mitchell Parish) – 3:40
 "I Got It Bad (and That Ain't Good)" (Paul Francis Webster) – 3:41
 "In a Mellow Tone" (Milt Gabler) – 6:20
 "Solitude" (Mills, Eddie DeLange) – 5:06
 "Don't Get Around Much Anymore" (Bob Russell) – 6:31
 "Do Nothing till You Hear from Me" (Russell) – 5:53
 "Caravan" (Mills, Tizol) – 6:10

Personnel
Joe Pass – guitar
Ray Brown – double bass
Bobby Durham – drums

Chart positions

References

External links
Jazzdisco.org

Joe Pass albums
1974 albums
Duke Ellington tribute albums
Albums produced by Norman Granz
Pablo Records albums